Rhena may refer to:

 Rhena (Korbach), a district of the town Korbach in Hesse, Germany
 Rhena (Neerdar), a river of Hesse, Germany, tributary of the Neerdar